FBC White Star are a Peruvian football club based in Arequipa, Arequipa Region. The women's football department of the club won the national league in 2009, and competed in that season's Copa Libertadores.

History

The club is recognized in Arequipa as one of the five "big" teams together with FBC Piérola, Sportivo Huracán, FBC Melgar and FBC Aurora, despite they being the only one of these that has failed to participate in the First Division.

The women's football department of the club won the Campeonato Nacional de Fútbol Femenino in 2009, after beating Estudiantes  Universitarios de Cusco 3–2 in the final, and thus qualifying to compete in that year's Copa Libertadores.

Rivalries
FBC White Star has had a long-standing rivalry with Melgar, Aurora, Piérola, and Sportivo Huracán.

Honours

National
Liga Provincial de Arequipa:
Winners (1): 1953
 Runner-up (3): 1963, 2011. 2019

Liga Distrital de Arequipa:
Winners (3): 1987, 2011, 2013
 Runner-up (4): 2009, 2010, 2016, 2019

Women's football
Campeonato Nacional de Fútbol Femenino: 1
Winners (1): 2009

See also
List of football clubs in Peru
Peruvian football league system

References

Football clubs in Peru
Women's football clubs in Peru
Association football clubs established in 1917